Mohan Rana (born 9 March 1964) is a Hindi language poet from India. He has published eight poetry collections in Hindi. His poems have been translated and published by the Poetry Translation Centre.

Biography

Mohan Rana was born in Delhi, India. He completed his graduate degree from Delhi University.

Literary career

The poet and critic, Nand Kishore Acharya, has written about Mohan Rana's poetry that,

A bilingual chapbook "Poems", an eclectic selection of fifteen poems, translated from Hindi by Lucy Rosenstein and Bernard O'Donoghue was published by the poetry translations center London in June 2011.
Sarah Maguire writes, ‘Mohan Rana’s vivid and accessible poems probe profound philosophical questions through the simple,  everyday imagery of stars, birds, rain and shirts. These deceptively understated, haunting poems, have been beautifully rendered into English by the distinguished Irish poet, Bernard O’Donoghue, working closely with the translator, Lucy Rosenstein and Mohan himself.’

The Chapbook "Poems" was world literature tour recommendation in the Guardian, "His poems offer an intriguing bridge between two cultures; a sense of dislocation alongside a sense of place."  The Guardian world literature tour recommendations: India

In the afterword of "The Cartographer", Alison Brackenbury writes Mohan Rana’s intricate metaphysical poems are subtle, like water they define through transparency. His poems undertake the deceptively simple process of understanding things as they are, in their ordinary brilliance. This selection of profound, contemplative verse – so often concerned with memory and time – is an excellent introduction to one of Hindi poetry’s most enthralling voices.

François Matarasso writes in his review of "The Cartographer", Mohan Rana’s concerns are not with the minutia of the day’s events, or the constantly renewed feelings that blow through our minds. He is in search of deeper, more elusive ideas that touch on the nature and meaning of existence. That involves testing other borders than those humans make between countries or even languages: nameless, invisible boundaries, in his own words.

Bibliography

Poetry collections in Hindi

Jagah (Dwelling, 1994)
Jaise Janam Koi Darwaza (As If Life Were a Door, 1997)
Subah ki Dak (Morning's Post, 2002)
Is Chhor Par (On This Shore, 2003)
Pathar Ho Jayegi Nadi (Stone-River, 2007)
Dhoop Ke Andhere (In the Darkness of the Sun, 2008) 
Ret ka Pul (Bridge of Sand, 2012) 
Shesh Anek (Much Remains, 2016)

Bilingual poetry collections

Poems  (Poems  translated by Lucy Rosenstein, Bernard O’Donoghue, June 2011)
The Cartographer (Poems  translated by Lucy Rosenstein, Bernard O’Donoghue,  November 2020)

Trilingual poetry collection

Nekje Daleč Sem Uzrl Zvezde (I saw the stars far off, Poems translated  from  English to Slovenian by  Andrej Pleterski, August  2020)

See also
 List of Hindi language poets

References

External links
 Mohan Rana Podcast: recorded live at the Whitechapel Gallery in London- Thursday 29 September 2016.
Listen to Mohan Rana reading his poetry - a British Library recording, 12 March 2010.
 Poem Podcast: A Standard Shirt - Thursday 28 April 2016. 
 Mohan Rana Poem Podcast: As the Past Approached - Thursday 9 June 2016.
Mohan Rana reads some poems and talks about his poetry in this video, recorded in Zaragoza (Spain)
 Poem Podcast:The Evening News and the Roof of the World by Mohan Rana

Hindi-language poets
1964 births
Living people
Indian male poets
Poets from Delhi